İlhan Eker (born 1 January 1983) is a Turkish former football defender. Standing at 185 cm, he was equally adept at playmaking and scoring.

Career
Eker has previously played for Balıkesirspor. From Balıkesirspor, he moved to Hacettepe Spor in 2001. Seven years later, Eker transferred from Gençlerbirliği OFTAŞ, which is now called Hacettepe Spor, to Gençlerbirliği. On June 2, 2010, the 27-year-old center back left Gençlerbirliği to sign with Fenerbahçe until 30 June 2013.
Eker was sent to Kayserispor in exchange for Serdar Kesimal to Fenerbahçe SK.

References

 İlhan Eker ve Ante Erceg Balıkesirspor'da, fotospor.com, 6 January 2016

External links
 

1983 births
Sportspeople from Balıkesir
Living people
Turkish footballers
Association football defenders
Balıkesirspor footballers
Hacettepe S.K. footballers
Gençlerbirliği S.K. footballers
Fenerbahçe S.K. footballers
Kayserispor footballers
Kasımpaşa S.K. footballers
Süper Lig players
TFF First League players